Mayra Ambriz (born May 21, 1986), known under the mononym Myra, is an American singer of Mexican descent. She is the first Latina artist to sign with Hollywood Records and Walt Disney Records.  She is best known for her 2001 singles "Dancing in the Street" for Recess: School's Out and "Miracles Happen (When You Believe)" for the film The Princess Diaries.

Career
Myra began singing at age nine; her first album was the mariachi album Mensajera del Amór,  released by Briaz Promotions in 1997. At the time of its release, she was known as Mayra Caról.

In May 2000, Myra signed with Walt Disney Records. Her first single was "Magic Carpet Ride", which was released May 23, 2000, as a part of the La Vida Mickey album.

Myra rose to prominence in 2001 for a recording a cover of Martha and the Vandellas's "Dancing in the Street" for the soundtrack to the 2001 film Recess: School's Out. The song was the first single released from her self-titled album Myra which was released on June 26, 2001. The second single from the album, "Miracles Happen (When You Believe)", was also featured in the film The Princess Diaries.

In October 2001, Myra made an appearance in the film Max Keeble's Big Move as Chelsea. During this time, she toured with Aaron Carter, opening for his 2000-2001 "Party" Tour. She was also a featured artist during the Radio Disney Live! 2001 World Tour.

In 2007, Myra was featured on the single, "Back To You" by Chicano rapper Veze Skante, that was included on the compilation album La Costa Nuestra. The following year, Myra was featured as a guest artist on a track by another Chicano rapper, Mal Hablado.

Personal life
In 2011, Myra had a daughter and attended college.

Discography

Studio albums

Extended plays

† = Japan only

† = Japan only

Filmography

Awards 
 The single "Miracles Happen (When You Believe)" received an award nomination for Outstanding Song in a Motion Picture Soundtrack at the ALMA Awards in 2002.
 Myra won the award Female Singer of the Year at Premios Lo Nuestro Gay 2016, hosted by Dorys Presenta and Valeria Montero at Lido's Nightclub in San Jose, California.

External links
 [ Myra] at AllMusic

References

1986 births
Living people
American child singers
American women pop singers
American female dancers
American dancers
American people of Mexican descent
Walt Disney Records artists
21st-century American women singers
21st-century American singers